Sam Barlow Williams (7 May 1921 in Seattle, Washington – 22 June 2009 in Indian Wells, California) was an American inventor and founder of Williams International. He was best known for his development of the small fan-jet engine, and received several prestigious awards for innovation in this field of aviation.

Among the awards that Williams received were:

 Collier Trophy 1978, presented by President Jimmy Carter
 Wright Brothers Memorial Trophy 1988, presented by President Ronald Reagan
 National Medal of Technology 1995, presented by President Bill Clinton

The Medal of Technology was awarded to Williams for:

He was also an inductee into the National Inventors Hall of Fame and the National Aviation Hall of Fame 1998. In addition to efforts in aviation, he helped promote inventors and inventions in medical research for cancer and for degenerative eye disease, with which he was afflicted.

Williams was a mechanical engineer for the Chrysler Corporation before starting his own company to develop and build small gas turbine engines. The first production contract was for an experimental gas turbine for a marine outboard.

See also
 Chrysler turbine engines

References

 Biography at National Inventors Hall of Fame
 Biography at National Aviation Hall of Fame
 Short bio from 2003 NBAA award presentation

1921 births
2009 deaths
American inventors
Collier Trophy recipients
National Medal of Technology recipients
Businesspeople from Seattle
National Aviation Hall of Fame inductees
People from Indian Wells, California
20th-century American businesspeople
American aerospace engineers
Aviation inventors